Rashid Harerimana is a Burundian professional footballer, who plays as a defender for A.S. Kigali and for the Burundi national football team.

International career
He was invited by Lofty Naseem, the national team coach, to represent Burundi in the 2014 African Nations Championship held in South Africa.

References

External links
 
 

Living people
Burundi A' international footballers
2014 African Nations Championship players
Burundian footballers
1994 births
Association football defenders
Burundi international footballers
Sportspeople from Bujumbura
AS Kigali FC players